Ethyl Cayoca Gabison (born December 17, 1976), also known by her stage name Ethel Booba, is a Filipina TV personality, author, singer, and comedienne. She has also worked in the recording industry. She was the first been crowned as the celebrity champion at Tawag ng Tanghalan of the noon-time television show It's Showtime.

Career

Gabison is a former talent of GMA Network and was one of the hosts of Extra Challenge. She also guest judged for Kakaibang Idol, a special edition of Philippine Idol.

Before becoming a star, she joined the singing contest of ABC, Sing Galing. She defended her title for four weeks and wore glamorous outfits each week. After winning the title and being held the grand champion, she signed a contract under GMA Network. She also became one of the housemates of Pinoy Big Brother Celebrity Edition 2. She currently makes several appearances on ABS-CBN.

On September 18, 2016, Gabison launched her first book titled #Charotism: The Wit and Wisdom of Ethel Booba at the SMX Convention Center, SM Mall of Asia; it was published by VRJ Books Publishing.

Filmography

Television

Film

Written work

Awards

References

1976 births
Living people
People from General Santos
Visayan people
Filipino women comedians
Filipino film actresses
Filipino women writers
Filipino television actresses
ABS-CBN personalities
Participants in Philippine reality television series
Pinoy Big Brother contestants
GMA Network personalities
TV5 (Philippine TV network) personalities